Mary Browne defeated Eleonora Sears 6–4, 6–2 in the tennis final of the 1912 U.S. Women's National Singles Championship. The event was held at the Philadelphia Cricket Club in Philadelphia in the United States from June 10 through June 15, 1912. The defending champion, Hazel Hotchkiss Wightman, did not participate in this edition and therefore no challenge round was played.

Draw

Finals

References

1912 in women's tennis
1912
1912 in American women's sports
Women's Singles
Chestnut Hill, Philadelphia
1910s in Philadelphia
1912 in sports in Pennsylvania
Women's sports in Pennsylvania